Chad N. Walker, is an American filmmaker and film editor. He is best known as the director of documentaries Brownstones to Red Dirt, We Must Go and I Am Big Bird: The Caroll Spinney Story.

Career
Before directing documentaries, he started to work as a visual effects coordinator for the short The Magic Scarf. Then he joined as Production assistant and assistant editor for the blockbuster films Ice Age: The Meltdown, Ice Age: Dawn of the Dinosaurs, Epic and Rio. Then in 2009, he became the apprentice editor for the film Horton Hears a Who!. In 2010, he made his directorial debut with the documentary Brownstones to Red Dirt. The film revolves around some children in Brooklyn become pen pals with orphans from Sierra Leone. After the success of the documentary, he made his second documentary Kei.

Then in 2014, he made I Am Big Bird: The Caroll Spinney Story along with Dave LaMattina. The film has received generally favorable reviews. In 2014, he won the Audience Choice Award for the Best Documentary at Cinéfest Sudbury International Film Festival for the film.

In 2007, he co-founded the documentary film production house, 'Copper Pot Pictures' accompany with Dave LaMattina and Clay Frost.

Partial filmography

References

External links
 

Film directors from New York City
American film editors
Living people
Year of birth missing (living people)